Antillo (Sicilian: Antiddu) is a comune (municipality) in the Metropolitan City of Messina in the Italian region Sicily, located about  east of Palermo and about  southwest of Messina.

Antillo borders the following municipalities: Casalvecchio Siculo, Castroreale, Fondachelli-Fantina, Francavilla di Sicilia, Graniti, Limina, Mongiuffi Melia, Motta Camastra, Roccafiorita, Rodì Milici.

References 

Cities and towns in Sicily
Articles which contain graphical timelines